Roy L. Conrad (November 11, 1940 – January 18, 2002) was an American actor, best known for his role as the voice actor of Ben in the 1995 LucasArts computer game Full Throttle.

Career
Conrad provided the voice of Ben in the LucasArts computer game Full Throttle.  He has also appeared in another LucasArts game, Star Wars: Rebel Assault II: The Hidden Empire, as the rebel pilot Ace Merrick.  Conrad also took smaller film roles in films such as Patch Adams, The Wizard and a role in the 1993 television series Dr. Quinn, Medicine Woman.

One of the developers of Full Throttle had this to say when recalling how they cast the part of Ben:

Roy was one of the sweetest guys you'll ever meet, and a joy to work with. It was hilarious to watch him act, and see that stern, gravelly voice of Ben coming out of this gentle, soft-spoken man. Casting Roy was definitely the easiest decision we ever had to make at LucasArts. We had been through boxes of audition tapes without much luck--When you advertise that you're looking for a tough, biker character, you get a lot of guys trying to be tough; Growling, yelling, and forcing a lot of attitude--And then we put in Roy's tape, and out came this effortless, deep, rich, bass sound. And that was that. We didn't even listen to another tape.

Conrad died of lung cancer in 2002 in Roseville, California.

Filmography

References

External links
 

1940 births
2002 deaths
American male video game actors
American male voice actors
Deaths from lung cancer in California
Place of birth missing